Markelo is a village in the Dutch province of Overijssel.

Markelo was a separate municipality between 1818 and 2001, when it became a part of Hof van Twente.

Overview 
It was first mentioned in 1188 as Marclo, and means either "forest near communal ground" or "forest near border". The Dutch Reformed Church has a 15th century tower, but the building dates from 1840. In 1818, it became an independent municipality. In 1840, it was home to 793 people.

In 1836, the gristmill De Hoop was built near Markelo. It has been restored in 1991. Markelo used to be an agricultural village, however the eastern side of the village has become a residential zone. In 2001, it became part of Hof van Twente.

Sports 
Since 1932, the motor club "Ons Genoegen" organises a motocross in Markelo. Originally the circuit was at Markelose Berg, but in 1947, the venue changed to Herikerberg where the terrain is more uneven. The motocross has turned into an international event.

Notable people 
 Maria van Beckum (before 1510–1544), Anabaptist who was burnt at the stake
 Bert Boom (born 1938), cyclist
 Wijnand Duyvendak (born 1957), politician
 Ellen Jansen (born 1992), footballer
 Gert-Jan Oplaat (born 1964), politician
 Anton Smit (born 1945), screenwriter, television and film producer
 Bakermat (born 1991), DJ and music producer

Gallery

References 

Municipalities of the Netherlands disestablished in 2001
Populated places in Overijssel
Former municipalities of Overijssel
Twente
Hof van Twente